In Māori tradition, Te Wakaringaringa was one of the great ocean-going, voyaging canoes that was used in the migrations that settled New Zealand. Ngāti Ruanui and Ngā Rauru iwi link their ancestry to Māwakeroa, the captain of Te Wakaringaringa.

See also
List of Māori waka

References

Māori waka
Māori mythology